Sukumar Sen may refer to:
Sukumar Sen (civil servant) (1899–1963), India's first Chief Election Commissioner
Sukumar Sen (linguist) (1900–1992), Bengali linguist and author